Dan Burton is an American politician.

Dan Burton may also refer to:
 Daniel Burton (born 1963), American bicyclist
 Dan Burton (actor) (born 1985), British actor
 Dan Burton (musician), a member of the band Ativin
 Danny Burton (coach), former head coach of Inglewood United FC